Eucalyptus proxima, commonly known as nodding mallee or red-flowered mallee, is a species of mallee that is endemic to a small area in the south-west of Western Australia. It has smooth greyish bark, lance-shaped adult leaves, flower buds in groups of seven, red to pink, sometimes yellowish flowers and conical to slightly bell-shaped fruit.

Description 
It has smooth grey bark that is shed to reveal pale orange or coppery new bark. Flowering occurs from September to November and the flowers are red to pink, sometimes yellowish.

Taxonomy and naming
Eucalyptus proxima was first formally described in 2005 by Dean Nicolle and Ian Brooker from a specimen they collected near Jerdacuttup in 2002. The specific epithet (proxima) is from the Latin word proximus, meaning "nearest" or "most similar", referring to similarity of this species to E. cernua.

Distribution and habitat
Nodding mallee grows in mallee shrubland between Ravensthorpe and Hopetoun in the Avon Wheatbelt, Esperance Plains and Mallee biogeographic regions.

Conservation status
This eucalypt is classified as "not threatened" by the Western Australian Government Department of Parks and Wildlife.

See also
List of Eucalyptus species

References

proxima
Myrtales of Australia
Eucalypts of Western Australia
Plants described in 2012
Taxa named by Ian Brooker